Jorge Nicolás Troncoso Ramírez (born 14 January 1993) is a Chilean professional footballer who plays as a midfielder for Austin Bold FC.

Career
A product of Colo-Colo youth system, he made his professional debut in 2011 when Américo Gallego was the head coach, in the match versus Cobreloa in 20 March. After having not much chances to play for the first team, he played for the B-team in the third level of the Chilean football and on loan at Curicó Unido and San Antonio Unido. In 2014 he moved to Universidad de Concepción and next he played for Deportes La Serena and Deportes Melipilla.

In 2019 he moved outside Chile and joined American club Austin Bold FC thanks to a Spanish agent. In the club he has coincided with Darío Conca, a well-known player in his country of birth, and with Edson Braafheid, a Dutch international.

References

External links
 
 
 Jorge Troncoso at PlaymakerStats

1993 births
Living people
Footballers from Santiago
Chilean footballers
Association football midfielders
Colo-Colo footballers
Curicó Unido footballers
Colo-Colo B footballers
San Antonio Unido footballers
Universidad de Concepción footballers
Deportes La Serena footballers
Deportes Melipilla footballers
Austin Bold FC players
Chilean Primera División players
Primera B de Chile players
Segunda División Profesional de Chile players
USL Championship players
Chilean expatriate footballers
Chilean expatriate sportspeople in the United States
Expatriate soccer players in the United States